Lyonpo Ugyen Tshering (born 1954?) is a Bhutanese politician who served as minister for foreign affairs between 2008 and 2013.

He served as minister for labor and human resources before resigning in mid-2007, along with six other ministers, in order to enter politics and stand in the 2008 general election. Following the election, he became Minister for Foreign Affairs on April 11, 2008.

References

Foreign ministers of Bhutan
Labor ministers of Bhutan
Living people
Bhutanese Buddhists
Bhutanese diplomats
Bhutanese politicians
Year of birth uncertain
Druk Phuensum Tshogpa politicians
Year of birth missing (living people)